Nathaniel Rich (born March 5, 1980) is an American novelist and essayist. Rich is the author of several books, was an editor for The Paris Review, and has contributed to several major magazines including The Atlantic, Harper's Magazine, and The New York Review of Books.

Early life
Rich is the son of Frank Rich, New York Magazine writer and former New York Times columnist, and Gail Winston, executive editor at HarperCollins. His youngest brother is writer Simon Rich. Rich attended Dalton School and is an alumnus of Yale University, where he studied literature. After graduating, he worked on the editorial staff of The New York Review of Books.

Career
Rich moved to San Francisco to write San Francisco Noir, which the San Francisco Chronicle named one of the best books of 2005. That year he was hired as an editor by The Paris Review.

The Mayor's Tongue was described by Carolyn See in The Washington Post as a "playful, highly intellectual novel about serious subjects – the failure of language, for one, and how we cope with that failure in order to keep ourselves sane".

NPR's Alan Cheuse called Odds Against Tomorrow a "brilliantly conceived and extremely well-executed novel ... a knockout of a book." Cathleen Schine wrote, in the New York Review of Books, "Let's just, right away, recognize how prescient this charming, terrifying, comic novel of apocalyptic manners is ... Rich is a gifted caricaturist and a gifted apocalyptist. His descriptions of the vagaries of both nature and human nature are stark, fresh, and convincing, full of surprise and recognition as both good comedy and good terror must be."

Personal life
Rich lives in New Orleans with his wife, Meredith Angelson, and their son.

Works

Fiction 

King Zeno. Farrar, Straus and Giroux. 2018 .

Nonfiction 

Losing Earth: A Recent History. Farrar, Straus and Giroux. 2019. .
 The Lawyer Who Became DuPont's Worst Nightmare for The New York Times, which Dark Waters (2019 film) is based on.

References

External links
 
 

1980 births
Living people
21st-century American novelists
American male novelists
American people of German-Jewish descent
American people of Russian-Jewish descent
Jewish American novelists
Yale University alumni
21st-century American male writers
21st-century American Jews